Pseudochromis erdmanni the Erdmann’s dottyback, is a species of ray-finned fish from the Pacific Ocean around Indonesia, which is a member of the family Pseudochromidae.

Etymology
The fish is named for Mark Erdmann of Conservation International, Indonesia, who collected the type specimens.

References

erdmanni
Taxa named by Anthony C. Gill
Taxa named by Gerald R. Allen
Fish described in 2011